The year 1667 in science and technology involved some significant events.

Astronomy
 June 24 – The site of the Paris Observatory is located on the Paris Meridian.

Chemistry
 Johann Joachim Becher originates what will become known as phlogiston theory in his Physical Education.

History and philosophy of science
 Thomas Sprat publishes The History of the Royal-Society of London, for the Improving of Natural Knowledge.

Mathematics
 James Gregory demonstrates the transcendence of π.

Physiology and medicine
 June 15 – Jean-Baptiste Denys performs the first blood transfusion from a lamb into a boy.
 Robert Hooke demonstrates that the alteration of the blood in the lungs is essential for respiration.
 Thomas Willis publishes Pathologicae Cerebri, et nervosi generis specimen.

Publications

 Nicolas Steno publishes Elementorum Myologiae Specimen, seu Musculi Descriptio Geometrica. Cui accedunt canis carchariae dissectum caput, et dissectus piscis ex canum genere in Florence, providing a foundation for the study of muscle mechanics, the ovary (based on his dissection of dogfish), and the sedimentary theory of geology.

Births
 April 29 (bapt.) – John Arbuthnot, Scottish-born polymath (died 1735)
 May 2 – Jacob Christoph Le Blon, German inventor of four-colour printing (died 1741)
 May 26 – Abraham de Moivre, French mathematician (died 1754)
 July 27 – Johann Bernoulli, Swiss mathematician (died 1748)

Deaths
 April 3 – Edward Somerset, 2nd Marquess of Worcester, English inventor (born 1601?)
 April 10 – Jan Marek Marci, Bohemian physician (born 1595)
 June 5 – Grégoire de Saint-Vincent, Flemish mathematician (born 1584)
 probable date – Peter Mundy, English traveller (born c. 1596)

References

 
17th century in science
1660s in science